Eldhose Alias is a composer, singer and lyricist in Malayalam films. He is one of the founders of the Malayalam Music composers group, 4 Musics.

References 

Living people
Indian male playback singers
Indian film score composers
Malayalam-language lyricists
Musicians from Kochi
1983 births
Indian male film score composers